Fernando Torres (14 December 1941 – 7 January 2009) was a Puerto Rican weightlifter. He competed at the 1960 Summer Olympics, the 1964 Summer Olympics and the 1968 Summer Olympics.

References

External links
 

1941 births
2009 deaths
Burials at Cementerio Las Mercedes
Puerto Rican male weightlifters
Olympic weightlifters of Puerto Rico
Weightlifters at the 1960 Summer Olympics
Weightlifters at the 1964 Summer Olympics
Weightlifters at the 1968 Summer Olympics
Sportspeople from Ponce, Puerto Rico
Pan American Games medalists in weightlifting
Pan American Games bronze medalists for Puerto Rico
Weightlifters at the 1959 Pan American Games
20th-century Puerto Rican people
21st-century Puerto Rican people